Antti Savolainen (born February 26, 1988) is a Finnish former ice hockey defenceman.

Savolainen began his career at Ilves, making his debut for the senior team during the 2006–07 SM-liiga season. He played nine games that season and scored one goal and one assist. He then played in two playoff games during the 2007–08 SM-liiga season.

On April 30, 2009, Savolainen signed with Hokki of Mestis and played with the team until 2012.

References

External links

1988 births
Living people
Finnish ice hockey defencemen
Hokki players
Ilves players
Iisalmen Peli-Karhut players
Lempäälän Kisa players
Ice hockey people from Tampere